Haluk Bayraktar (born 4 October 1978) is a Turkish engineer and executive. He is the CEO of Baykar, TUBITAK Board Member and founder and chairman of the board of Turkey Technology Team Foundation (T3 Foundation) and SAHA Istanbul. He is a pioneer of Turkey for autonomous technology efforts which reshaped battlefields and geopolitics which resulted with a change of future warfare doctrines.

Life 
Haluk Bayraktar is the CEO of Baykar, Turkey’s premiere autonomous technology company. Haluk began his tenure at Baykar in 2004 as an engineering manager when Baykar’s autonomous technology efforts were still nascent. He has since been involved in every aspect of the business from engineering to project management to logistics support and business development.

Haluk is also one of the founders of the Turkey Technology Team (T3) Foundation, an initiative intended to foster technology education among Turkish youth through entrepreneurship, competitions, and supplementary technology education.

Additionally, Haluk was one of the founders and chairman of the board of Turkey’s Aerospace and Defense Cooperative (SAHA Istanbul), which includes over 600 companies and 16 universities.

During the first wave of the COVID-19 pandemic, he turned his company's engineering expertise to rapidly develop intensive health care ventilators and supported mass serial production.

During 2022 Russian invasion of Ukraine, he took a clear stance with Ukraine when pressed by CNN presenter Julia Chatterley, who repeatedly asked, “Would you supply Russia?”, Bayraktar responded: “We have not delivered or supplied them with anything, [and] we will as well never do such a thing because we support Ukraine, support its sovereignty, its resistance for its independence.”

Bayraktar said he is proud that Bayraktar TB2 has become one of the symbols of the Ukrainian resistance against Russia.

Honours and medals

References

1978 births
Chevaliers of the Order of Merit (Ukraine)
Living people